Coleophora longispina is a moth of the family Coleophoridae. It is found in China.

References

longispina
Moths described in 1998
Moths of Asia